Markus Hundhammer (born September 19, 1980) is a German professional ice hockey player. He is currently an Unrestricted Free Agent. He most recently played for the Straubing Tigers in the Deutsche Eishockey Liga (DEL).

References

External links

1980 births
Living people
German ice hockey centres
Straubing Tigers players
Sportspeople from Landshut
EV Landshut players